The Chris Rock Show was a weekly, Friday night, late-night talk show featured on HBO. It was created by comedian and namesake Chris Rock and featured various guests. The show won an Emmy for Outstanding Writing for a Variety or Music Program in 1999. It ran for five seasons from February 7, 1997, to November 25, 2000.

Series overview

Episodes

Season 1 (1997)
{| class="wikitable plainrowheaders" style="width:100%;"
|- style="color:white"
!  style="background:#812f09; width:5%;"| No. inseason
!  style="background:#812f09; width:5%;"| No. inseries 
!  style="background:#812f09; width:30%;"| Interview Guest
!  style="background:#812f09; width:30%;"| Musical (or other) Guest
!  style="background:#812f09; width:20%;"| Original air date
|-

|}

Season 2 (1997)
{| class="wikitable plainrowheaders" style="width:100%;"
|-
!  style="background:LightSeaGreen; width:5%;"| No. inseason
!  style="background:LightSeaGreen; width:5%;"| No. inseries 
!  style="background:LightSeaGreen; width:30%;"| Interview Guest
!  style="background:LightSeaGreen; width:30%;"| Musical (or other) Guest
!  style="background:LightSeaGreen; width:20%;"| Original air date
|-

|}

Season 3 (1998)
{| class="wikitable plainrowheaders" style="width:100%;"
|- 
!  style="background:DarkKhaki; width:5%;"| No. inseason
!  style="background:DarkKhaki; width:5%;"| No. inseries 
!  style="background:DarkKhaki; width:30%;"| Interview Guest
!  style="background:DarkKhaki; width:30%;"| Musical (or other) Guest
!  style="background:DarkKhaki; width:20%;"| Original air date
|-

|}

Season 4 (1999)
{| class="wikitable plainrowheaders" style="width:100%;"
|- 
!  style="background:DeepSkyBlue; width:5%;"| No. inseason
!  style="background:DeepSkyBlue; width:5%;"| No. inseries 
!  style="background:DeepSkyBlue; width:30%;"| Interview Guest
!  style="background:DeepSkyBlue; width:30%;"| Musical (or other) Guest
!  style="background:DeepSkyBlue; width:20%;"| Original air date
|-

|}

Season 5 (2000)
{| class="wikitable plainrowheaders" style="width:100%;"
|- 
!  style="background:Darkgrey; width:5%;"| No. inseason
!  style="background:Darkgrey; width:5%;"| No. inseries 
!  style="background:Darkgrey; width:30%;"| Interview Guest
!  style="background:Darkgrey; width:30%;"| Musical (or other) Guest
!  style="background:Darkgrey; width:20%;"| Original air date
|-

|}

Home media
There have been four DVD releases of The Chris Rock Show in Region 1. The two "Best of" DVDs that were released were later repackaged into a single compilation in 2005. Seasons 1 and 2 were released as a DVD set in 2006. Most of the episodes were released uncut, however for contractual reasons the segment featuring (The Artist Formerly Known as) Prince has been removed from the first episode of Season 1. The Seasons 1 and 2 DVD features a Chris Rock commentary on episodes 1 and 12.

References

External links
 

1997 American television series debuts
2000 American television series endings
1990s American sketch comedy television series
2000s American sketch comedy television series
1990s American television talk shows
2000s American television talk shows
1990s American variety television series
2000s American variety television series
English-language television shows
HBO original programming
Primetime Emmy Award-winning television series
Television series created by Chris Rock